Danielle R. Holley (born ) is the dean of the Howard University School of Law. In 2023, Mount Holyoke College announced that she was appointed their twentieth president and would be starting on July 1, 2023. 

In 2022, she was mentioned by The New York Times as a possible Joe Biden Supreme Court candidate to succeed retiring Justice Stephen Breyer.

Career 
Holley received a B.A. from Yale University in 1996, and a J.D. from Harvard Law School in 1999. She then served as a law clerk for Chief Judge Carl E. Stewart of the United States Court of Appeals for the Fifth Circuit. Holley served as associate dean for academic affairs at the University of South Carolina School of Law, from which position she was named dean of the Howard University School of Law in 2014.

Holley is a Liberty Fellow through the Aspen Global Leadership network. She is also on the board of the Lawyers’ Committee for Civil Rights.

See also 
 Joe Biden Supreme Court candidates

References

External links
Dean Danielle Holley-Walker, at Howard University School of Law

1970s births
Harvard Law School alumni
Howard University School of Law faculty
Deans of law schools in the United States
University of South Carolina faculty
Yale University alumni
Living people